Simon John Dennis MBE (born 24 August 1976) is a British rower and Olympic gold medalist.

Dennis was born in Henley-on-Thames, Oxfordshire. He started rowing at St Paul's School, London, coached by Michael Streat and his first international appearance was in 1994 in the GB eight at the World Rowing Junior Championships, winning a bronze medal.  After school he attended Imperial College London, winning two Henley Royal Regatta races with them.

He raced in the eight at the World Championships in 1997 and 1998, before rowing with Steve Williams in the coxless pair for the 1999 season, winning the Silver Goblets and Nickall's Challenge cup at Henley.  In 2000 he returned to the men's eight which won a gold medal at the Sydney Olympics.   He is now a teacher of Biology at Marlborough College in Wiltshire.

Achievements

 Olympic Medals: 1 Gold
 World Championship Medals: 0
 Junior World Championship Medals: 1 Bronze

Olympic Games
 2000 — Gold, Eight (with Andrew Lindsay, Ben Hunt-Davis, Louis Attrill, Luka Grubor, Kieran West, Fred Scarlett, Steve Trapmore, Rowley Douglas)

World Championships
 2001 — 5th, Eight
 1999 — 5th, Coxless Pair (with Steve Williams)
 1998 — 7th, Eight
 1997 — 4th, Eight

Junior World Championships
 1994 — Bronze, Eight

References

External links
 

1976 births
Living people
Olympic rowers of Great Britain
Rowers at the 2000 Summer Olympics
Alumni of Imperial College London
Members of the Order of the British Empire
People educated at Claires Court School
People educated at St Paul's School, London
English male rowers
English Olympic medallists
Olympic gold medallists for Great Britain
People from Henley-on-Thames
Olympic medalists in rowing
Medalists at the 2000 Summer Olympics